Heilongjiang Dragons is a Chinese professional women's basketball club based in Daqing, Heilongjiang, playing in the Women's Chinese Basketball Association (WCBA).

Season-by-season records

Current players

Notable former players

 Mfon Udoka (2002–03)
 Monique Ambers (2004–06)
 Jessica Davenport (2009–10)
 Chasity Melvin (2010–11)
 Rashidat Junaid (2011–12)
 Sasha Goodlett (2012–13)
 Abi Olajuwon (2013)
 Lauren Jackson (2013–14)
 Isabelle Yacoubou (2014–15)
 Vicky McIntyre (2015–16)
 Crystal Langhorne (2016–17)
 Aneika Henry (2017–18)
 Ma Yi-hung (2009–10, 2012–13)
 Kim Hyang (2012–13)
 Kim Yeong-ok (2013–14)
 Miao Lijie (2002–09)
 Song Liwei (2002–08)
 Gao Song (2007–12)

References 

 
Women's Chinese Basketball Association teams
Sport in Heilongjiang
Sport in Daqing